Robert Gifford may refer to:
Robert Gifford, 1st Baron Gifford (1779–1826), British barrister, judge, and politician
Robert Gifford, 2nd Baron Gifford (1817–1872), his son
Robert Swain Gifford (1840–1905), American painter
Robert Gifford (psychologist), Canadian psychologist

See also
Robert Giffard de Moncel
Rob Gifford, British radio correspondent